Czech Film Critics' Award for Best Actor is one of the awards given to the best Czech motion picture.

Winners

References

External links

Film awards for lead actor
Czech Film Critics' Awards
Awards established in 2014